Milltown State Park is a public recreation area located at the confluence of the Clark Fork River and the Blackfoot River in Missoula County, Montana, United States. The state park opened in 2018 after the removal of the Milltown Dam and the remediation of the Milltown Reservoir Superfund Site. The park encompasses 635 acres and offers trails for hiking and biking, picnicking, and scenic overlooks.

References

External links
Milltown State Park Montana Fish, Wildlife & Parks
Milltown State Park Map Montana Fish, Wildlife & Parks

State parks of Montana
Protected areas of Missoula County, Montana
Protected areas established in 2018